"Fall in Love with Me" is a song by American band Earth, Wind & Fire, released in November 1982 upon Columbia Records as the first single from their twelfth album, Powerlight (1983). It rose to No. 4 on the US Billboard R&B Singles chart, No. 17 on the Billboard Hot 100 chart and No. 14 on the Canadian RPM Top Singles chart. "Fall In Love With Me" was Grammy nominated for Best R&B Performance by a Duo or Group with Vocals.

Overview
"Fall in Love with Me" was produced by Maurice White and composed by White, Wayne Vaughn and Wanda Vaughn of The Emotions. As well the song came upon EWF's 1983 studio album Powerlight.

The single's b-side was a song called Lady Sun from EWF's 1981 studio album Raise!.

A music video was also released in 1983 to accompany the single.

Critical reception
Billboard said it has a "characteristically elegant production, all silken backing vocals, mellow horns and skittery rhythm guitar." Charles McCollum of the Hartford Courant found that "Fall in Love with Me -the set's new single - is particularly striking with a fine, quasi-scat vocal from 
(Maurice) White." Vanity Fair wrote "Fall in Love With Me, the single, is a classic disco throbber, with Maurice White inviting listeners to help yourself to all of me". Christopher Connelly of Rolling Stone exclaimed "A bit of the grit that surfaced on Raise! gives 'Fall in Love with Me' a needed push". Connie Johnson of the Los Angeles Times noted that "Fall in Love with Me and The Speed of Love allow for scatty rude-boy vocals from (Maurice) White. They're also packed with the chiming, multilayered backup vocals and complex melodic development that are quintessential EWF." Chip Stern of Musician wrote "Fall in Love With Me featur(es) White's gruff but kindly midrange". Craig Lytle of AllMusic proclaimed that the song has "a festive rhythm and sauntering vocals".

Charts

Weekly charts

Year-end charts

References

1982 singles
Earth, Wind & Fire songs
Songs written by Maurice White
1982 songs
Columbia Records singles